Kirloskar may refer to 
Kirloskar Group an Indian conglomerate that relates to
Kirloskar Brothers, a pump manufacturing company
Kirloskar Pneumatic Company Limited
Toyota Kirloskar Motor, a subsidiary of Toyota, which is partly owned by Kirloskar Group
Laxmanrao Kirloskar (1869–1956), an Indian businessman and the founder of the Kirloskar Group
S. L. Kirloskar (1903–1994), an Indian businessman, son of Laxmanrao
Sanjay Kirloskar (born 1957), an Indian businessman, grandson of S. L. Kirloskar
Annasaheb Kirloskar (1843–1885), an Indian playwright